Ross Correctional Institution (RCI) is an Ohio Department of Rehabilitation and Correction (ODRC) close security state prison for men located in Ross County, Ohio, near Chillicothe, Ohio, adjacent to the medium-security Chillicothe Correctional Institution and the Hopewell Culture National Historical Park.  First opened in 1987, Ross houses 2,037 inmates. The institution covers 1,707 acres and employed over 350 security staff. As of January 6, 2016, there are 2085 inmates at the institution. Around 56% of the inmate population are classified as African American, 43% classified as Caucasian, and 0.01% classified as other. As of 2016, ODRC estimates that the daily cost for each inmate is $51.77.

Staff 
Gary C. Mohr has been appointed to be director of the Ohio Department of Rehabilitation and Correction From 2011 to 2018. Mohr had past experience in leadership as a corrections officer and a warden, including in Ohio Department of Youth Services and Ross Correctional Institutional.

Roger Wilson is the chief inspector of the Ohio Department of Rehabilitation and Correction. The chief inspector is responsible for maintaining order within the institution by addressing issues with investigation and inspection.

Composition
The prison lies in Union Township.

Healthcare 
Ross Correctional Institution provides inmates with primary, secondary, and third level health care. Intensive care is supported by Frazier Health Center and Franklin Medical Center. The Ohio State University Medical Center also works with the institution for emergencies and long term hospitalization. Inmates are charged with a $3 co-pay from their personal accounts.

Telemedicine was introduced to the institution in March 1995, which helped increase communication between primary care physicians and inmates. Over 19,000 consultations have been done through telemedicine.

Inmate programs 
Community Service
 Crayons to Computers
 Job and Family Services – sewing teddy bears
 Job and Family Services – wrapping holiday presents
 Habitat for Humanity
 Canine for Companies
Academic 
 Adult Basic Education
 GED
Vocational 
 Carpentry
 Barbering
 Administrative office technology
Religious Services
 Bible Study
 Worship Service
 Jehovah Witness
 Taleem
 Seventh Day Adventist

Policies 
 Prison Rape Elimination
 Prison Sexual Misconduct – Reporting, Response, Investigation and Prevention of Retaliation 
 Sexual Abuse Review Team
 PREA Risk Assessment and Accommodation Strategy 
 Lesbian, Gay, Bisexual, Transgender and Intersex

References

Prisons in Ohio
Buildings and structures in Ross County, Ohio
1987 establishments in Ohio